The Senate of Venezuela was the upper house of Venezuela's legislature under its 1961 constitution. Under the 1999 constitution, the bicameral system was replaced by the unicameral National Assembly of Venezuela. However, since 1999 the former chamber of senators has been used by the National Assembly for solemn meetings and other special functions.

In Venezuela, lifetime Senate seats existed from 1961 to 1999. The former Presidents who held this position were: Rómulo Betancourt (1964-1981), Raúl Leoni (1969-1972), Rafael Caldera (1974-1994, 1999), Carlos Andrés Pérez (1979-1989, 1994-1996), Luis Herrera Campins (1984-1999) and Jaime Lusinchi (1989-1999).

At the Senate's last election in 1998, it had 54 elected members (48 elected two per state plus 6 additional to get a more proportional result) and 3 lifetime senators.

Presidents of the Senate 
Primary sources:

References

See also
 National Assembly (Venezuela), Unicameral legislature of Venezuela since 2000
 Venezuelan Chamber of Deputies, Lower house of Venezuela 1961-1999

Legislative branch of the Government of Venezuela
Defunct upper houses
1961 establishments in Venezuela
1999 disestablishments in Venezuela